Hotel Club Akumal Caribe is a resort located along the shore of Akumal Bay (62 miles south of Cancún), in the Caribbean tourism district referred to as the Riviera Maya in Quintana Roo, Mexico. 

The resort is still owned, at least in large part, by the Pablo Bush family who founded Akumal itself, a diving town established in the 1950s. Considered the first resort in Akumal, Hotel Club Akumal Caribe remains an independent, family-run hotel.  The resort's symbol, a tribal depiction of a turtle, comes from the meaning of the mayan word "Akumal," which popularly translates to "place of the turtles." This choice of symbol reflects the year-round presence of green turtles and Hawksbill turtles in Akumal Bay.

External links
Hotel Akumal Caribe website

Club Akumal Caribe
Buildings and structures in Quintana Roo
Seaside resorts in Mexico
Tulum (municipality)
Tourist attractions in Quintana Roo
Hotels established in 1960
Hotel buildings completed in 1960